Galigudem is a village and Gram panchayat in Chouderiguda mandal in Ranga Reddy district.

References

Villages in Ranga Reddy district